The Battle of Fraga was a battle of the Spanish Reconquista that took place on 17 July 1134 at Fraga, Aragon, Spain. The battle was fought between the forces of the Kingdom of Aragon, commanded by Alfonso the Battler and a variety of Almoravid forces that had come to the aid of the town of Fraga which was being besieged by King Alfonso I. The battle resulted in an Almoravid victory. The Aragonese monarch Alfonso I died shortly after the battle.

Context 
Since the second half of the 11th century, the kings of Aragón and the counts of Barcelona and of Urgel tried with obstinacy to conquer the Muslim held towns and frontier fortresses of the Marca Superior. Specifically, they targeted the low lands around the Segre and Cinca Rivers all the way to the mouth of the Ebro, an active and prosperous region with direct access to the Mediterranean Sea. The most important towns in this region were Lleida, Mequinenza, Fraga, and Tortosa.

The battle
In July 1134, King Alfonso I of Aragon the Battler, known by the Muslims as Ibn Rudmir (literally "son of Ramiro) or al-Farandji, laid siege to the town of Fraga with an army from Aragon. The Almoravid response was swift and decisive. The Emir of Cordoba, son of the caliph, equipped a force of 2,000 knights, the Emir of Murcia and Valencia put together 500 knights, and the governor of Lleida another 200. Once these forces combined, they marched to the relief of Fraga.

The day of 17 July 1134 brought the arrival of an Almohad relief force, led by the governor of Lérida, Ibn ‘Iyad. Seeing reinforcements, the besieged Fragans sallied out, however Alfonso I, still confident in his numerical and tactical advantage, rallied his troops. His entourage clashed with the cavalry of the emir of Murcia, Yahya ben Ghaniya. The Almoravid cavalry decimated the Aragonese soldiers. Upon seeing this, the townspeople, most of whom were of Arab origin, exited the city and fell upon the Aragonese camp pillaging and killing a majority of the soldiers there. They made off with all of the Aragonese army's provisions and took them back into the city of Fraga. At this moment, the emir of Cordoba launched a final attack with his cavalry and broke the Christian troops once again. Having lost a majority of his soldiers, Alfonso I the Battler was obliged to flee and made for Zaragoza. He died 7 September 1134.

Casualties and Aftermath 
The Aragonese toll at Fraga was significant. Amongst the dead or captured were many notable members of Aragonese society. Guy of Lescar fought with the Christian forces, was captured by the Almoravid forces, and imprisoned at Balensiyya.

Aside from the king, the following notable Aragonese knights were killed at Fraga:
 Aimery II of Narbonne
 Centula VI, the viscount of Béarn
 Bertrán de Risnel

See also 
 Alfonso I of Aragon
 Reconquista
 Almoravid dynasty

Notes

References

Sources

1134 in Europe
Fraga
Fraga
Fraga
Fraga
Fraga
Fraga
12th century in Al-Andalus